Lookin At Lucky  (foaled May 27, 2007 in Kentucky) is a champion American Thoroughbred racehorse who won the 2010 Preakness Stakes. He was the 2009 Champion Two-Year-Old and 2010 Champion Three-Year-Old, becoming the first horse in 32 years to win these awards.

Background
Sired by Smart Strike, a half brother to Canadian Triple Crown Winner Dance Smartly, his dam, Private Feeling, was sired by Belong To Me by the North American Leading Sire of 1993, Danzig.

Bred by Gulf Coast Farms, Lookin At Lucky was bought back as a yearling for $35,000 at the 2008 Keeneland September Sale. After working 1/8 of a mile in 10 seconds, Lookin at Lucky was bought by popular trainer Bob Baffert at the 2009 Keeneland April Sale for $475,000. Lookin At Lucky raced for owners Mike Pegram, Karl Watson, and Paul Weitman.

2009: Two-Year-Old Season
Lookin At Lucky broke his maiden at the Cushion Track at Hollywood Park on July 11, going 6 furlongs.

He followed up this win in the Grade 2 Best Pal Stakes at Del Mar Racetrack. Ridden by Garrett Gomez, he finished the six and a half furlongs in a time of 1:16.06.

His next start was the Del Mar Futurity which he won in final time of 1:22.85.

Lookin At Lucky solidified his entrance into the Breeders' Cup Juvenile by winning the Grade One Norfolk Stakes with final time of 1:43.11 in a full field of 12.

Going off as the favorite from post 13, Lookin At Lucky had a difficult trip and finished second by a head behind the long shot European winner, Vale of York in the Breeders' Cup Juvenile.

On December 19, Lookin At Lucky sealed American Champion Two-Year-Old Colt honors with a win over chief rival Noble's Promise in the CashCall Futurity.

2010: Three-Year-Old Season
On March 13, Lookin At Lucky made his three-year-old debut at Oaklawn Park with a win in the Rebel Stakes. He won by a head over arch-rival Noble's Promise, even though he stumbled badly during the run down the backstretch.

On April 3, he had a horrendous trip under Garrett Gomez in the Santa Anita Derby. Bumped, jostled, and virtually ridden into the fence, Lookin At Lucky finished third.

Going into the 2010 Kentucky Derby, Lookin At Lucky was made the favorite after the scratch of Eskendereya. Drawing the number one inside post, he was pinned to the rail and had nowhere to go until a late run to wind up sixth, making it his first off-the-board finish.

After a disappointing Kentucky Derby finish, trainer Bob Baffert turned to young jockey Martin Garcia and fired Garrett Gomez after three consecutive races where the veteran jockey could not keep the horse out of trouble. On May 15, Garcia rode Lookin At Lucky to a win in the 135th running of the Preakness Stakes at Pimlico Race Course in Baltimore, Maryland. Lookin At Lucky went off as the 2–1 second choice and paid $6.80 to win in a time of 1:55.47, holding off pacesetter First Dude and the late-charging Jackson Bend.

Martin Garcia rode Lookin At Lucky again in the Haskell Invitational. The 6-5 favorite, he broke a bit awkwardly, but Garcia steadied him and positioned him three wide on the first turn. Entering the far turn while still 3 paths wide, he moved past his competitors, winning the race by four lengths over upcoming Trappe Shot, followed by First Dude and Super Saver, the Kentucky Derby winner. He received a career-best 105 Beyer Speed Figure for the most dominant performance of his career.

Lookin at Lucky developed an illness after the Haskell and missed a month of training. Regrouping, Baffert pointed his star toward the Indiana Derby, held at small Hoosier Park. Lookin At Lucky drew post position 6 in a field of nine horses and became the overwhelming favorite at odds of 2–5. He broke well but fell back to last early in the race and around the first turn. Still in eighth place on the backstretch, Lookin At Lucky came five-wide around the far turn, caught the leader in late home-stretch and won by 1 lengths. He earned a 103 Beyer Speed Figure for his performance.

After his win in the Indiana Derby, Baffert pointed the horse toward the 27th running of the Breeders' Cup Classic. Lookin At Lucky trained well but was compromised by a "minor infection and a cough" a week before the race. "I had to treat him with antibiotics, and sometimes that's hard on a horses system,"  Baffert said. Lookin At Lucky was healthy for the race, but was placed farther back than usual early and finished fourth.

Stud career
In November 2010, Lookin At Lucky was purchased by Coolmore Stud and retired.
He then entered stud at Coolmore's Ashford Stud near Versailles, Kentucky. His initial stud fee was set at $35,000.

Lookin At Lucky's first foal was born in January 2012 at Royal Pegasus Farm in Lexington, Kentucky. The foal, a dark bay filly, was out of the Storm Cat mare Awesome. Lookin At Lucky was represented by his first winner in May 2014 when filly Lucky'stormwarning won a maiden race at Gulfstream Park. His first stakes winner came in August 2014 when colt Four Leaf Chief won the Louisiana Cup Juvenile Stakes at Louisiana Downs.

He currently serves as a "shuttle stallion", traveling to Coolmore's Australian operations during the Southern Hemisphere breeding season. In 2012, Lookin At Lucky began shuttling to Chile to stand at Haras Paso Nevado, a farm near Santiago. He shuttled to Chile alongside fellow Ashford stallion Scat Daddy.

Notable Progeny
Lookin At Lucky's most notable progeny includes:

United States (Northern Hemisphere) 
 Accelerate: 2018 Horse of the Year finalist and champion older dirt male (Santa Anita Handicap, Gold Cup at Santa Anita, Pacific Classic, Awesome Again Stakes, Breeders' Cup Classic)
 Country House: Winner of the 2019 Kentucky Derby
 Madefromlucky: Winner of the Peter Pan Stakes, West Virginia Derby, Greenwood Cup Stakes, and  Stakes. 
 Dr. Dorr: Winner of the Californian Stakes and Gr.I-placed.
 Breaking Lucky: Winner of the Seagram Cup Stakes and Prince of Wales Stakes, multiple Gr.I placed.
 Lucky Player: Winner of the Iroquois Stakes.
 Lookin At Lee: Won Ellis Park Juvenile Stakes, runner-up in 2017 Kentucky Derby.
 Money Multiplier:Winner of the Monmouth Stakes, multiple Gr.I-placed. 
 Diamond Oops: Winner of the Smile Sprint Stakes, multiple Gr.I-placed. 
 Four Leaf Chief: Multiple stakes winner
 Good Luck Gus: Multiple stakes winner
 Protective Shield: Multiple stakes winner

Lookin At Lucky has also sired stakes winners and graded stakes placed runners Spider's Alibi, Linda's Luck, La Piba, One Lucky Dane, Maybellene, Giuseppe the Great, Dolphus, and Summer Luck.

Chile (Southern Hemisphere) 
 Wow Cat (CHI): Winner of the Gran Criterium, Cl Tanteo de Potranca, Mil Guineas (all CHI-G1), and Cl Jose Saavedra Baeza (CHI-G3). Also won the Gr. 1 Beldame Stakes in the US. 
 Kurilov (CHI): Winner of the GP Hipodromo Chile (CHI-G1)
 Conquer (CHI): Winner of the Cl Alberto Vial Infante (CHI-G1)
 Full of Luck (CHI): Winner of the El Derby (CHI-G1) and Cl Criadores Machos, GP Coronacion, Cl Otono (CHI-G2)
 Artigal (CHI): Winner of the Hugo Bourchier (CHI-G1) and Gran Handicap de Chile (CHI-G3)
 Tinku (CHI): Winner of the Cl Juan S. Jackson (CHI-G2)
 Luckita (CHI): Winner of the Cl Haras de Chile (CHI-G2)
 Lucky Sisi (CHI): Winner of the GP Criadores (CHI-G2)
 Jacare (CHI): Winner of the Cl Alvaro Covarrubias (CHI-G3)

Pedigree

See also
 List of historical horses

References

 Lookin At Lucky's pedigree and racing stats
 Lookin At Lucky at Coolmore Stud

2007 racehorse births
Racehorses bred in Kentucky
Racehorses trained in the United States
Eclipse Award winners
Thoroughbred family 9-f